Dharitri is a social satire drama in Odia, released on 30 March 1973. It is based on Amulya Kumari Patnaik's novel of the same name. Sarat Pujari, Prashant Nanda, Sriram Panda, Bhanumati Devi and Dhira Biswal acted in key roles.

Synopsis
Girish Choudhury is a pseudo-social activist and politician. He has two sons, Subhendu and Sudhir. To get popularity in society, he gets his daughter-in-law from a poor family for his son Subhendu. Subhendu doesn't like his wife Mamata and stays in town engaged in the contracting business with the help of his father. Girish's wife always tortures Mamata and asks for dowry. Mamata silently bears all the pain and torture caused by her mother-in-law. Sudhir, a revolutionist, doesn't accept the things happening in his house and revolts against his father, mother and brother. at last he gets success uniting Subhendu and Mamata.

Cast
 Sarat Pujari as Subhendu Choudhury
 Bhanumati Devi as Girish's wife 
 Prashant Nanda as Rabi
 Sriram Panda as Sudhir Choudhury
 Dhira Biswal as Girish Choudhury
 Sandhya Acharya as Mamata
 Bhim Singh as Braja
 Govind Tej as Usha's father
 Shyamalendu Bhattacharjee as Sudhir's friend 
 Dinabandhu Das as Murali
 Babaji Sahu as Mamu
 Narendra Behera as Sudhir's friend 
 Aneema Pedini as Ragini
 Alpana Nayak as Usha

Soundtrack
The music for the film was composed by Upendra Kumar.

Trivia
Actor Sriram Panda debuted in the film.

Awards
 2nd Orissa State Film Awards 1974
 Best Film 
 Best director - Nitai Palit

References

External links
 
 Enewsodia Ollywood Entertainment News

1973 films
1970s Odia-language films